Charles Crofts may refer to:

 Charlie Crofts (1871–1950), Australian trade unionist
 Charles Crofts (cricketer) (1822–1893), English cricketer

See also 
 Charles Croft (disambiguation)